Matthew White (born 17 May 1984) is a former Australian rugby league footballer.

Background
Born in Armidale, New South Wales, White played his junior rugby league for the Inverell Hawks, before being signed by the Newcastle Knights.

Playing career

2005
In round 1 of the 2005 NRL season, White made his NRL debut for the Newcastle Knights against the Melbourne Storm.

2009
In 2009, after playing 28 games for the Knights, White joined the Gold Coast Titans on a one-year contract. He made his Gold Coast debut in round 1 against his former club Newcastle.

2011
White made 23 appearances for the Gold Coast in the 2011 NRL season as the club finished last on the table and claimed the wooden spoon.

2012
On 11 July, White re-signed with the Gold Coast on a three-year contract.

2013
In 2013, White suffered an Anterior cruciate ligament injury which ruled him out for the entire 2013 NRL season.

2014
On 4 June, White extended his contract with the Gold Coast from the end of 2015 to the end of 2016.

2015
On 25 August, White signed a one-year contract with the Melbourne Storm starting in 2016, after being released from the final year of his Gold Coast contract.

2016
White managed to make only three appearances for Melbourne in the 2016 NRL season as the club won the Minor Premiership.  White did not feature in the club's finals campaign or the 2016 NRL Grand Final.

Later career
White later played  in England for Barrow Raiders in 2017, retiring at the end of the 2018 Queensland Cup season after a final season with the Burleigh Bears.

References

1984 births
Living people
Australian rugby league players
Burleigh Bears players
Eastern Suburbs Tigers players
Gold Coast Titans players
Kurri Kurri Bulldogs players
Melbourne Storm players
Newcastle Knights players
Rugby league players from Armidale, New South Wales
Rugby league props